Apion Pleistoneices ( Apíōn Pleistoníkēs; 30–20 BC – c. AD 45–48), also called Apion Mochthos, was a Hellenized Egyptian grammarian, sophist, and commentator on Homer. He was born at the Siwa Oasis and flourished in the first half of the 1st century AD. His name is sometimes incorrectly spelt Appion, and some sources, as in the Suda, call him a son of Pleistoneices, while others more correctly state that Pleistoneices was only a surname, and that he was the son of Poseidonius.

Life 
Apion studied at Alexandria under Apollonius the Sophist (the son of Archibius of Alexandria) and Didymus, from whom he inherited his love for the Homeric poems. He settled in Rome at an unknown date, and taught rhetoric as the successor of the grammarian Theon until the reign of Claudius.

Apion appears to have enjoyed an extraordinary reputation for his extensive knowledge and his versatility as an orator; but the ancients are unanimous in censuring his ostentatious vanity. He declared that every one whom he mentioned in his works would be immortalized; he placed himself by the side of the greatest philosophers of ancient Greece, and used to say that Alexandria ought to be proud of having a man like himself among its citizens. However, none of his works survived. It is likely that the name cymbalum mundi, by which Tiberius was accustomed to call him, was meant to express both his loquacity and his boastful character. He is spoken of as the most active of grammarians. According to the Suda, his surname was Mochthos (μόχθος), which is usually explained as describing the zeal and labour with which he prosecuted his studies.

In the reign of Caligula, Apion travelled about in Greece, and was received everywhere with the highest honours as the great interpreter of Homer. About the same time, 38 AD, the inhabitants of Alexandria raised complaints against the Jews residing in their city and endeavored to curtail their rights and privileges. They sent an embassy to emperor Caligula, which was headed by Apion, for he was a skillful speaker and known to entertain a great hatred of the Jews. The latter also sent an embassy, which was headed by Philo. In this transaction, Apion appears to have overstepped the limits of his commission, for he not only brought forward the complaints of his fellow-citizens but endeavored to excite the emperor's anger against the Jews by reminding him that they refused to erect statues to him and to swear by his sacred name. The results of this embassy, as well as the remaining part of Apion's life, are unknown; but if we may believe the account of his enemy Josephus, he died of a disease which he had brought upon himself by his dissolute mode of life.

Works
Apion wrote several works, none of which has survived. The well-known story "Androclus and the Lion", which is preserved in Aulus Gellius<ref>Aulus Gellius. Attic Nights V.xiv</ref> is from his work: Aegyptiaca/Αἰγυπτιακά ("Wonders of Egypt"). The surviving fragments of his work are printed in the Etymologicum Gudianum, ed. Sturz, 1818.Upon Homer, whose poems seem to have formed the principal part of his studies, for he is said not only to have made the best recension of the text of the poems, but to have written explanations of phrases and words in the form of a dictionary (Λέξεις Ὁμηρικαί), and investigations concerning the life and native country of the poet. The best part of his Λέξεις Ὁμηρικαί are supposed to be incorporated in the Homeric Lexicon of Apollonius. Apion's labors upon Homer are often referred to by Eustathius and other grammarians.
A work on Egypt (Αἰγυπτιακά) consisting of five books, which was highly valued in antiquity, for it contained descriptions of nearly all the remarkable objects in Egypt. It also contained numerous attacks upon the Jews.Gel. 5.14
A work in praise of Alexander the Great.
Histories of separate countries. (Ἱστορία κατὰ ἔθνος, Suda s. v. Ἀπίων.)
On the celebrated glutton Apicius.On the language of the Romans (Περὶ τῆς ‛Ρωμαίων διαλέκτου).De metallica disciplina.Androclus and the Lion and The Dolphin near Dicaearchia. The greatest fragments of the works of Apion are the story about Androclus and his lion, and about the dolphin near Dicaearchia.

Epigrams
In the Suda we find references to Apion as a writer of epigrams (s. vv. Ἀγύρτης, σπιλάδες, σφάραγον, and τρίγληνα), but whether he is the same as the grammarian is uncertain.

Notes

References
Cynthia Damon, "'The Mind of an Ass and the Impudence of a Dog:' A Scholar Gone Bad," in Ineke Sluiter and Ralph M. Rosen (eds), Kakos: Badness and Anti-value in Classical Antiquity'' (Leiden/Boston: Brill, 2008) (Mnemosyne: Supplements. History and Archaeology of Classical Antiquity, 307),

External links
 
Jewish Encyclopedia on Apion
Josephus Against Apion by Dr. Henry Abramson

20s BC births
40s deaths
Ancient Greek grammarians
Jews and Judaism in the Roman Empire
1st-century Egyptian people
Homeric scholars